Fiars may relate to:
 Fiar, in Scots law, owner in fee simple of a property subject to a liferent
 Fiars Prices,  in Scottish history, prices of grain fixed by the sheriff

See also
 FIAR, Italian avionics and radar manufacturer
 Friar, member of a Christian mendicant order